Castanopsis evansii is a tree in the family Fagaceae. It is named for J. H. Evans, a governor of Puerto Princesa in the Philippines.

Description
The greyish bark is smooth, sometimes flaky.

Distribution and habitat
Castanopsis evansii grows naturally in Borneo and the Philippines. Its habitat is dipterocarp forests up to  altitude.

References

evansii
Trees of Borneo
Trees of the Philippines
Plants described in 1913